Allitt is a surname, and may refer to the following people:
 Beverley Allitt (born 1968), English serial child killer
 Mary Allitt (1925–2013), Australian cricketer
 Patrick Allitt (born 1956), English historian

See also 
 William Allitt Academy in South Derbyshire, England

References 

English-language surnames